Kalyan is a village of Lahore District in the Punjab province of Pakistan.

References

Villages in Lahore District